Lord of Higuera de Vargas is a hereditary title in the Peerage of Spain accompanied by the dignity of Grandee, granted in 1390 by John I to Alonso Fernández de Vargas. The title makes reference to Higuera de Vargas, a town in Badajoz.

Lords of Higuera de Vargas (1390)

Alonso Fernández de Vargas, 1st Lord of Higuera de Vargas
Gonzalo Pérez de Vargas, 2nd Lord of Higuera de Vargas
Juan de Vargas y Sánchez de Badajoz, 3rd Lord of Higuera de Vargas
Juan de Vargas y Suárez de Figueroa, 4th Lord of Higuera de Vargas
Mencía de Vargas y Suárez de Figueroa, 5th Lord of Higuera de Vargas
Arias Pérez de Silva y Vargas-Figueroa, 6th Lord of Higuera de Vargas
Francisco de Vargas y Silva, 7th Lord of Higuera de Vargas
Juan de Vargas y Silva, 8th Lord of Higuera de Vargas
Francisco de Vargas y Silva, 9th Lord of Higuera de Vargas
García Pérez de Vargas y Silva, 10th Lord of Higuera de Vargas
Juana de Vargas y Silva, 11th Lady of Higuera de Vargas
Gabriel de Silva y Vargas, 12th Lord of Higuera de Vargas
Francisco de Silva y Vargas de Mendoza, 13th Lord of Higuera de Vargas
Isabel de Silva y Vargas de Mendoza, 14th Lady of Higuera de Vargas
Fernando Sánchez de Silva y Vargas, 15h Lord of Higuera de Vargas
Juan Sánchez de Silva y Vega, 16th Lord of Higuera de Vargas
Juana Sánchez De Silva y Cáceres, 17th Lady of Higuera de Vargas
María Joaquina de Cáceres y Quiñones, 18th Lady of Higuera de Vargas
María de la Esclavitud Sarmiento de Sotomayor y Quiñones, 19th Lady of Higuera de Vargas
Carlos Gutiérrez de los Ríos y Sarmiento de Sotomayor, 20th Lord of Higuera de Vargas
María Gutiérrez de los Ríos y Vicente de Solís, 21st Lady of Higuera de Vargas
María del Pilar Osorio y Gutiérrez de los Ríos, 22nd Lady of Higuera de Vargas
Manuel Felipe Falcó y Osorio, 23rd Lord of Higuera de Vargas
Manuel Falcó y Álvarez de Toledo, 24th Lord of Higuera de Vargas
Manuel Falcó y Anchorena, 25th Lord of Higuera de Vargas

See also
List of lords in the peerage of Spain
List of current Grandees of Spain

References

Lords of Spain
Lists of Spanish nobility